George MacDonald  (10 December 1824 – 18 September 1905) was a Scottish author, poet and Christian  Congregational minister. He became a pioneering figure in the field of modern fantasy literature and the mentor of fellow-writer Lewis Carroll. In addition to his fairy tales, MacDonald wrote several works of Christian theology, including several collections of sermons.

His writings have been cited as a major literary influence on many notable authors including  Lewis Carroll, W. H. Auden, David Lindsay,
J. M. Barrie, Lord Dunsany, Elizabeth Yates, Oswald Chambers, Mark Twain, Hope Mirrlees, Robert E. Howard, L. Frank Baum, T. H. White, Richard Adams, Lloyd Alexander, Hilaire Belloc, G. K. Chesterton, Robert Hugh Benson, Dorothy Day, Thomas Merton, Fulton Sheen, Flannery O'Connor, Louis Pasteur, Simone Weil, Charles Maurras, Jacques Maritain, George Orwell, Aldous Huxley, Ray Bradbury, C. H. Douglas, C. S. Lewis, J. R. R. Tolkien, Walter de la Mare, E. Nesbit, Peter S. Beagle, Elizabeth Goudge, Brian Jacques, M. I. McAllister, Neil Gaiman and Madeleine L'Engle.

C. S. Lewis wrote that he regarded MacDonald as his "master": "Picking up a copy of Phantastes one day at a train-station bookstall, I began to read. A few hours later, I knew that I had crossed a great frontier." G. K. Chesterton cited The Princess and the Goblin as a book that had "made a difference to my whole existence".

Elizabeth Yates wrote of Sir Gibbie, "It moved me the way books did when, as a child, the great gates of literature began to open and first encounters with noble thoughts and utterances were unspeakably thrilling."

Even Mark Twain, who initially disliked MacDonald, became friends with him, and there is some evidence that Twain was influenced by him. The Christian author Oswald Chambers wrote in his Christian Disciplines that "it is a striking indication of the trend and shallowness of the modern reading public that George MacDonald's books have been so neglected".

Early life
George MacDonald was born on 10 December 1824 at Huntly, Aberdeenshire, Scotland. His father, a farmer, was descended from the Clan MacDonald of Glen Coe and a direct descendant of one of the families that suffered in the massacre of 1692.

MacDonald grew up in an unusually literate environment: one of his maternal uncles was a notable Celtic scholar, editor of the Gaelic  Highland  Dictionary and collector of fairy tales and Celtic oral poetry. His paternal grandfather had supported the publication of an edition of James Macpherson's Ossian, the controversial epic poem based on the Fenian Cycle of Celtic Mythology and which contributed to the starting of European Romanticism. MacDonald's step-uncle was a Shakespeare scholar, and his paternal cousin another Celtic academic. Both his parents were readers, his father harbouring predilections for Isaac Newton, Robert Burns, William Cowper, Chalmers, Samuel Taylor Coleridge, and Charles Darwin, to quote a few, while his mother had received a classical education which included multiple languages.

An account cited how the young George suffered lapses in health in his early years and was subject to problems with his lungs such as asthma, bronchitis and even a bout of tuberculosis. This last illness was considered a family disease and two of MacDonald's brothers, his mother, and later three of his own children died from the illness. Even in his adult life, he was constantly travelling in search of purer air for his lungs.

MacDonald grew up in the Congregational Church, with an atmosphere of Calvinism. However, his family was atypical, with his paternal grandfather a Catholic-born, fiddle-playing, Presbyterian elder; his paternal grandmother an Independent church rebel; his mother was a sister to the Gaelic-speaking radical who became moderator of the Free Church, while his step-mother, to whom he was also very close, was the daughter of a priest of the Scottish Episcopal Church.

MacDonald graduated from the University of Aberdeen in 1845 with a degree in chemistry and physics. He spent the next several years struggling with matters of faith and deciding what to do with his life. His son, biographer Greville MacDonald, stated that his father could have pursued a career in the medical field but he speculated that lack of money put an end to this prospect. It was only in 1848 that MacDonald began theological training at Highbury College for the Congregational ministry.

Early career 

MacDonald was appointed minister of Trinity Congregational Church, Arundel, in 1850, after briefly serving as a locum minister in Ireland. However, his sermons—which preached God's universal love and that everyone was capable of redemption—met with little favour and his salary was cut in half. In May 1853, MacDonald tendered his resignation from his pastoral duties at Arundel. Later he was engaged in ministerial work in Manchester, leaving that because of poor health. An account cited the role of Lady Byron in convincing MacDonald to travel to Algiers in 1856 with the hope that the sojourn would help turn his health around. When he got back, he settled in London and taught for some time at the University of London. MacDonald was also for a time editor of Good Words for the Young.

Writing career

MacDonald's first novel David Elginbrod was published in 1863.

MacDonald is often regarded as the founding father of modern fantasy writing.
His best-known works are Phantastes, The Princess and the Goblin, At the Back of the North Wind, and Lilith (1895), all fantasy novels, and fairy tales such as "The Light Princess", "The Golden Key", and "The Wise Woman". "I write, not for children", he wrote, "but for the child-like, whether they be of five, or fifty, or seventy-five." MacDonald also published some volumes of sermons, the pulpit not having proved an unreservedly successful venue.

After his literary success, MacDonald went on to do a lecture tour in the United States in 1872–1873, after being invited to do so by a lecture company, the Boston Lyceum Bureau. On the tour, MacDonald lectured about other poets such as Robert Burns, Shakespeare, and Tom Hood. He performed this lecture to great acclaim, speaking in Boston to crowds in the neighbourhood of three thousand people.

MacDonald served as a mentor to Lewis Carroll: it was MacDonald's advice, and the enthusiastic reception of Alice by MacDonald's many sons and daughters, that convinced Carroll to submit Alice for publication. Carroll, one of the finest Victorian photographers, also created photographic portraits of several of the MacDonald children. MacDonald was also friends with John Ruskin, and served as a go-between in Ruskin's long courtship with Rose La Touche. While in America he was befriended by Longfellow and Walt Whitman.

MacDonald's use of fantasy as a literary medium for exploring the human condition greatly influenced a generation of notable authors, including C. S. Lewis, who featured him as a character in his The Great Divorce. In his introduction to his MacDonald anthology, Lewis speaks highly of MacDonald's views: 

Others he influenced include J. R. R. Tolkien and Madeleine L'Engle. MacDonald's non-fantasy novels, such as Alec Forbes, had their influence as well; they were among the first realistic Scottish novels, and as such MacDonald has been credited with founding the "kailyard school" of Scottish writing.

Chesterton cited The Princess and the Goblin as a book that had "made a difference to my whole existence", in showing "how near both the best and the worst things are to us from the first ... and making all the ordinary staircases and doors and windows into magical things."

Later life
In 1877 he was given a civil list pension. From 1879 he and his family lived in Bordighera, in a place much loved by British expatriates, the Riviera dei Fiori in Liguria, Italy, almost on the French border. In that locality there also was an Anglican church, All Saints, which he attended. Deeply enamoured of the Riviera, he spent 20 years there, writing almost half of his whole literary production, especially the fantasy work. MacDonald founded a literary studio in that Ligurian town, naming it Casa Coraggio (Bravery House). It soon became one of the most renowned cultural centres of that period, well attended by British and Italian travellers, and by locals, with presentations of classic plays and readings of Dante and Shakespeare often being held.

In 1900 he moved into St George's Wood, Haslemere, a house designed for him by his son, Robert, its building overseen by his eldest son, Greville.

George MacDonald died on 18 September 1905 in Ashtead, Surrey, England. He was cremated in Woking, Surrey, and his ashes were buried in Bordighera, in the English cemetery, along with his wife Louisa and daughters Lilia and Grace.

Personal life 

MacDonald married Louisa Powell in Hackney in 1851, with whom he raised a family of eleven children: Lilia Scott (1852), Mary Josephine (1853–1878), Caroline Grace (1854), Greville Matheson (1856–1944), Irene (1857), Winifred Louise (1858), Ronald (1860–1933), Robert Falconer (1862–1913), Maurice (1864), Bernard Powell (1865–1928), and George Mackay (1867–1909?).

His son Greville became a noted medical specialist, a pioneer of the Peasant Arts movement, wrote numerous fairy tales for children, and ensured that new editions of his father's works were published. Another son, Ronald, became a novelist. His daughter Mary was engaged to the artist Edward Robert Hughes until her death in 1878. Ronald's son, Philip MacDonald (George MacDonald's grandson), became a Hollywood screenwriter.

Tuberculosis caused the death of several family members, including Lilia, Mary Josephine, Grace, Maurice as well as one granddaughter and a daughter-in-law. MacDonald was said to have been particularly affected by the death of Lilia, his eldest.

There is a blue plaque on his home at 20 Albert Street, Camden, London.

Theology

According to biographer William Raeper, MacDonald's theology "celebrated the rediscovery of God as Father, and sought to encourage an intuitive response to God and Christ through quickening his readers' spirits in their reading of the Bible and their perception of nature."

MacDonald's oft-mentioned universalism is not the idea that everyone will automatically be saved, but is closer to Gregory of Nyssa in the view that all will ultimately repent and be restored to God.

MacDonald appears to have never felt comfortable with some aspects of Calvinist doctrine, feeling that its principles were inherently "unfair"; when the doctrine of predestination was first explained to him, he burst into tears (although assured that he was one of the elect). Later novels, such as Robert Falconer and Lilith, show a distaste for the idea that God's electing love is limited to some and denied to others.

Chesterton noted that only a man who had "escaped" Calvinism could say that God is easy to please and hard to satisfy.

MacDonald rejected the doctrine of penal substitutionary atonement as developed by John Calvin, which argues that Christ has taken the place of sinners and is punished by the wrath of God in their place, believing that in turn it raised serious questions about the character and nature of God. Instead, he taught that Christ had come to save people from their sins, and not from a Divine penalty for their sins: the problem was not the need to appease a wrathful God, but the disease of cosmic evil itself. MacDonald frequently described the atonement in terms similar to the Christus Victor theory. MacDonald posed the rhetorical question, "Did he not foil and slay evil by letting all the waves and billows of its horrid sea break upon him, go over him, and die without rebound—spend their rage, fall defeated, and cease? Verily, he made atonement!"

MacDonald was convinced that God does not punish except to amend, and that the sole end of His greatest anger is the amelioration of the guilty. As the doctor uses fire and steel in certain deep-seated diseases, so God may use hell-fire if necessary to heal the hardened sinner. MacDonald declared, "I believe that no hell will be lacking which would help the just mercy of God to redeem his children." MacDonald posed the rhetorical question, "When we say that God is Love, do we teach men that their fear of Him is groundless?"  He replied, "No. As much as they were will come upon them, possibly far more. ... The wrath will consume what they call themselves; so that the selves God made shall appear."

However, true repentance, in the sense of freely chosen moral growth, is essential to this process, and, in MacDonald's optimistic view, inevitable for all beings (see universal reconciliation).

MacDonald states his theological views most distinctly in the sermon "Justice", found in the third volume of Unspoken Sermons.

Bibliography

The following is an incomplete list of MacDonald's published works in the genre now referred to as fantasy:

Fantasy

Phantastes: A Fairie Romance for Men and Women (1858)
"Cross Purposes" (1862)
The Portent: A Story of the Inner Vision of the Highlanders, Commonly Called "The Second Sight" (1864)
Dealings with the Fairies (1867), containing "The Golden Key", "The Light Princess", "The Shadows", and other short stories
At the Back of the North Wind (1871)
Works of Fancy and Imagination (1871), including Within and Without, "Cross Purposes", "The Light Princess", "The Golden Key", and other works
The Princess and the Goblin (1872)
The Wise Woman: A Parable (1875) (Published also as "The Lost Princess: A Double Story"; or as "A Double Story".)
 Multiple versions with different content of The Light Princess and other Stories 
The Gifts of the Child Christ and Other Tales (1882; republished as Stephen Archer and Other Tales) 1908 edition by Edwin Dalton, London was illustrated by Cyrus Cuneo and G. H. Evison. Available online at the Hathi Trust.
The Day Boy and the Night Girl (1882)
The Princess and Curdie (1883), a sequel to The Princess and the Goblin
Lilith: A Romance (1895)

Fiction

David Elginbrod (1863; republished in edited form as The Tutor's First Love), originally published in three volumes
Adela Cathcart (1864); contains many fantasy stories told by the characters within the larger story, including "The Light Princess", "The Shadows", etc.
Alec Forbes of Howglen (1865; edited by Michael Phillips and republished as The Maiden's Bequest; edited to children's version by Michael Phillips and republished as Alec Forbes and His Friend Annie)
Annals of a Quiet Neighbourhood (1867)
Guild Court: A London Story (1868; republished in edited form as The Prodigal Apprentice). 1908 edition by Edwin Dalton, London was illustrated by G. H. Evison. Available online at Hathi Trust. 
Robert Falconer (1868; republished in edited form as The Musician's Quest)
The Seaboard Parish (1869), a sequel to Annals of a Quiet Neighbourhood
Ranald Bannerman's Boyhood (republished in edited form as The Boyhood of Ranald Bannerman) (1871)
Wilfrid Cumbermede (1871)
The Vicar's Daughter (1871), a sequel to Annals of a Quiet Neighborhood and The Seaboard Parish. 1908 edition by Sampson Low and Company, London was illustrated by Cyrus Cuneo and G. H. Evison.  
The History of Gutta Percha Willie, the Working Genius (1873; republished in edited form as The Genius of Willie MacMichael), usually called simply Gutta Percha Willie
Malcolm (1875)
St. George and St. Michael (1876; edited by Dan Hamilton and republished as The Last Castle)
Thomas Wingfold, Curate (1876; republished in edited form as The Curate's Awakening)
The Marquis of Lossie (1877; republished in edited form as The Marquis' Secret), the second book of Malcolm
 Sir Gibbie (1879):  With simultaneous publication of Vol. 2 and Vol. 3, each of ca. 300 pages. Also issued by Lippincott in America in a single volume set in two columns in smaller font, in 210 pages,  The entirety of the original text is available with a Broad Scots glossary by its digitizer, John Bechard, see  Republished in edited form as  Also as The Baronet's Song.
Paul Faber, Surgeon (1879; republished in edited form as The Lady's Confession), a sequel to Thomas Wingfold, Curate
Mary Marston (1881; republished in edited form as A Daughter's Devotion and The Shopkeeper's Daughter)
Warlock o' Glenwarlock (1881; republished in edited form as Castle Warlock and The Laird's Inheritance)
Weighed and Wanting (1882; republished in edited form as A Gentlewoman's Choice)
Donal Grant (1883; republished in edited form as The Shepherd's Castle), a sequel to Sir Gibbie
What's Mine's Mine (1886; republished in edited form as The Highlander's Last Song)
Home Again: A Tale (1887; republished in edited form as The Poet's Homecoming)
The Elect Lady (1888; republished in edited form as The Landlady's Master)
A Rough Shaking (1891; republished in edited form as The Wanderings of Clare Skymer)
There and Back (1891; republished in edited form as The Baron's Apprenticeship), a sequel to Thomas Wingfold, Curate and Paul Faber, Surgeon
The Flight of the Shadow (1891)
Heather and Snow (1893; republished in edited form as The Peasant Girl's Dream)
Salted with Fire (1896; republished in edited form as The Minister's Restoration)
Far Above Rubies (1898)

Poetry
The following is a list of MacDonald's published poetic works:

Twelve of the Spiritual Songs of Novalis (1851), privately printed translation of the poetry of Novalis
Within and Without: A Dramatic Poem (1855)
 
"A Hidden Life" and Other Poems (1864)
"The Disciple" and Other Poems (1867)
Exotics: A Translation of the Spiritual Songs of Novalis, the Hymn-book of Luther, and Other Poems from the German and Italian (1876)
Dramatic and Miscellaneous Poems (1876)
Diary of an Old Soul (1880)
A Book of Strife, in the Form of the Diary of an Old Soul (1880), privately printed
The Threefold Cord: Poems by Three Friends (1883), privately printed, with Greville Matheson and John Hill MacDonald
 
The Poetical Works of George MacDonald, 2 Volumes (1893)
Scotch Songs and Ballads (1893)
Rampolli: Growths from a Long-planted Root (1897)

Nonfiction

The following is a list of MacDonald's published works of non-fiction:
Unspoken Sermons (1867)
England's Antiphon (1868, 1874)
The Miracles of Our Lord (1870)
Cheerful Words from the Writing of George MacDonald (1880), compiled by E. E. Brown
Orts: Chiefly Papers on the Imagination, and on Shakespeare (1882)
"Preface" (1884) to Letters from Hell (1866) by Valdemar Adolph Thisted
The Tragedie of Hamlet, Prince of Denmarke: A Study With the Text of the Folio of 1623 (1885)
Unspoken Sermons, Second Series (1885)
Unspoken Sermons, Third Series (1889)
A Cabinet of Gems, Cut and Polished by Sir Philip Sidney; Now, for the More Radiance, Presented Without Their Setting by George MacDonald (1891)
The Hope of the Gospel (1892)
A Dish of Orts (1893)
Beautiful Thoughts from George MacDonald (1894), compiled by Elizabeth Dougall

In popular culture

 American classical composer John Craton has utilized several of MacDonald's stories in his works, including "The Gray Wolf" (in a tone poem of the same name for solo mandolin – 2006) and portions of "The Cruel Painter", Lilith, and The Light Princess (in Three Tableaux from George MacDonald for mandolin, recorder, and cello – 2011).
 Contemporary new-age musician Jeff Johnson wrote a song titled "The Golden Key" based on George MacDonald's story of the same name. He has also written several other songs inspired by MacDonald and the Inklings.
 Jazz pianist and recording artist Ray Lyon has a song on his CD Beginning to See (2007), called "Up The Spiral Stairs", which features lyrics from MacDonald's 26 and 27 September devotional readings from the book Diary of an Old Soul.
 Tori Amos and Samuel Adamson created a musical of The Light Princess which was premiered for the Royal National Theatre in London in 2013.
 A verse from The Light Princess is cited in the "Beauty and the Beast" song by Nightwish.
 Rock group The Waterboys titled their album Room to Roam (1990) after a passage in MacDonald's Phantastes, also found in Lilith. The title track of the album comprises a MacDonald poem from the text of Phantastes set to music by the band. The novels Lilith and Phantastes are both named as books in a library, in the title track of another Waterboys album, Universal Hall (2003).

See also
 Christian existentialism
 Fairytale fantasy
 Mythopoeia

References

Footnotes

Works cited

 Greville. George Macdonald and his wife, 1924, MacVeagh, New York

Further reading

 Ankeny, Rebecca Thomas. The Story, the Teller and the Audience in George MacDonald's Fiction. Lewiston, New York: Edwin Mellen Press, 2000.
 Wingfold. A journal "Celebrating the works of George MacDonald". Published by Barbara Amell
 Thomas Gerold, Die Gotteskindschaft des Menschen. Die theologische Anthropologie bei George MacDonald, Münster: Lit, 2006  (A study of MacDonald's theology).
 Gray, William N. "George MacDonald, Julia Kristeva, and the Black Sun." SEL: Studies in English Literature 1500–1900 36.4 (Autumn 1996): 877–593. Accessed 19 May 2009.
 Rolland Hein, George MacDonald: Victorian Mythmaker. Star Song Publishing, 1993. 
 Lewis, C. S. Surprised by Joy.
 McGillis, Roderick, ed. For the Childlike: George MacDonald's Fantasies for Children. Metuchen, NJ, and London: The Children's Literature Association and the Scarecrow Press, Inc., 1992.
 Greville MacDonald, George MacDonald and his Wife, London: *George Allen & Unwin, 1924 (republished 1998 by Johannesen 
 George MacDonald Selections From His Greatest Works, compiled by David L. Neuhouser, published by Victor Press 1990. 
 William Raeper, George MacDonald. Novelist and Victorian Visionary, Tring, Herts., and Batavia, IL: Lion Publishing, 1987
 Robb, David S. George MacDonald. Edinburgh: Scottish Academic Press, 1987.
 Wolff, Robert Lee. The Golden Key: A Study of the Fiction of George Macdonald. New Haven: Yale University Press, 1961.
 Worthing, Mark W. Phantastes: George MacDonald's Classic Fantasy Novel. Northcote Victoria: Stone Table Books, 2016.  
 Worthing, Mark W. Narnia, Middle-Earth and the Kingdom of God: A History of Fantasy Literature and the Christian Tradition. Northcote Victoria: Stone Table Books, 2016

External links

Digital collections
 
 
 
 Christian Classics Ethereal Library
 Extracts from Scribner's Monthly, etc. containing a few poems and translations of Novalis (Cornell University's "Making of America" Journal Collection)
 Several Works  at Penn State University's Electronic Classics (pdf format)
 Alec Forbes of Howglen. (Ebook/PDF format)

Physical collections
 The Marion E. Wade Center – George MacDonald research collection at Wheaton College, Wheaton, IL
 George MacDonald Collection. General Collection, Beinecke Rare Book and Manuscript Library, Yale University.

Audio collections
 
 Audio recordings of GM Works ongoing
 Free audio recording of "The Golden Key" at librivox.org

Biographical information
 The George MacDonald Informational Web
 George MacDonald on The Victorian Web
 Life and Works of George MacDonald

Scholarly work
 North Wind. A Journal of George MacDonald Studies. The Journals of the George MacDonald Society
 The Center for the Study of C.S. Lewis and Friends – Taylor University at taylor.edu

Other links
  Mark Twain, George MacDonald's Friend Abroad, at GeorgeMacdonald.info
 George MacDonald Society
 Mark Twain and George MacDonald: The Salty and the Sweet
 

 
1824 births
1905 deaths
19th-century Christian mystics
19th-century Christian universalists
19th-century Scottish novelists
19th-century Scottish poets
19th-century Scottish writers
Alumni of the University of Aberdeen
Christian novelists
Christian poets
Christian universalist clergy
Christian universalist theologians
Fabulists
Kailyard school
Lallans poets
Mythopoeic writers
People from Huntly
Protestant mystics
Protestant philosophers
Scottish anti-communists
Scottish children's writers
Scottish Christian theologians
Scottish Christian universalists
Scottish Congregationalist ministers
Scottish Christian poets
Scottish expatriates in Italy
Scottish fantasy writers
Scottish male novelists
Scottish male poets
Scottish philosophers
Victorian novelists
Fellows of the Society of Antiquaries of Scotland